is a town located in Yatsushiro District, Kumamoto Prefecture, Japan.

The town was formed on October 1, 2005 from the merger of the towns of Miyahara and Ryūhoku.

As of March 2017, the town has an estimated population of 12,250 and a density of 370 persons per km². The total area is 33.29 km².

Famous people from Hikawa
Uchida Kosai - statesman
Hoshiro Mitsunaga - founder of Dentsu
Koji Akiyama - retired professional baseball player

References

External links

Town website 

Towns in Kumamoto Prefecture